The 1998 Milton Keynes Council election took place on 7 May 1998 to elect members of Milton Keynes Unitary Council in Buckinghamshire, England. One third of the council was up for election and the Labour party stayed in overall control of the council.

After the election, the composition of the council was
Labour 27
Liberal Democrat 19
Conservative 4
Independent 1

Election result

References

1998 English local elections
1998
1990s in Buckinghamshire